White apple is a common name for several flowering plants, neither in the apple/rose family, Rosaceae, and may refer to:

Endiandra virens, native to Australia
Syzygium forte, native to Australia